Ricardo Rogério de Brito, better known by his nickname Alemão (born 22 November 1961), is a former Brazilian professional footballer who played as a defensive midfielder. His nickname means German in the Portuguese language. A tenacious and physical yet technically gifted player, Alemão was a strong, consistent, hard-working, and versatile midfielder, who excelled in a holding role as either a defensive midfielder or deep-lying playmaker, due to his tactical intelligence, energy, tackling, and his ability to read the game, as well as his capacity to start attacking plays after winning back possession.

Nickname
The nickname, "Alemão" ("the German"), was attributed to his blond hair and fair complexion, making him similar in appearance to the many German immigrants in Brazil.

Playing career

Club
Born in Lavras, Minas Gerais, Alemão started his career playing for a Minas Gerais' club called Fabril in 1980. In 1981, he moved to Botafogo, of Rio de Janeiro, where he stayed until 1987, winning the Bola de Prata award of Placar Magazine in 1985. In 1987, and in 1988, he played for Atlético Madrid, of Spain, scoring six goals in 35 games, and won the EFE Trophy as best South American player and the La Liga Foreign Player of the Year in 1988. Between 1988, and 1992, he played 93 games and scored nine goals for Napoli of Italy, playing alongside star offensive players like Diego Maradona and Careca as a defensive foil. With Napoli, he won the UEFA Cup in 1989, scoring a goal in the final, followed by the Serie A title and the Supercoppa Italiana in 1990. In 1992, he signed with Atalanta of Italy, scoring two goals in 40 games, until he left the club in 1994. In 1994, he returned to Brazil, playing 77 games and scoring two goals for São Paulo, winning two international titles with the club in 1994, the Copa CONMEBOL, and the Recopa Sudamericana; he remained with the club until 1996, when he moved to Volta Redonda and retired from football.

International
Alemão was capped 39 times for the Brazil national football team, between June 1983, and June 1990, scoring six goals, and he was part of the national team squad for the 1986 FIFA World Cup and the 1990 FIFA World Cup. He was also part of the Brazilian team that won the 1989 Copa América. He played his last game for the Brazilian national team on June 24, 1990, when his team was defeated by Argentina in the second round of the 1990 FIFA World Cup.

Managerial career
Alemão started his managerial career in 2007, at Tupynambás, then in 2008, he was hired as manager of América Mineiro, which was, on that season, on second division of the Minas Gerais State League, but was promoted to the first level under his management.

Honours

Club
Napoli
UEFA Cup: 1988–89
Serie A: 1989–90
Supercoppa Italiana: 1990

São Paulo
Recopa Sudamericana: 1994 
Copa CONMEBOL: 1994

International
Brazil
Copa América: 1989

Individual
Placar Magazine Bola de Prata Award: 1985
EFE Trophy for Best South American Player of the Year: 1988
La Liga Foreign Player of the Year: in 1988

References

External links

1961 births
Living people
People from Lavras
Brazilian people of German descent
Brazilian footballers
Association football midfielders
Botafogo de Futebol e Regatas players
Atlético Madrid footballers
S.S.C. Napoli players
Atalanta B.C. players
São Paulo FC players
Volta Redonda FC players
Campeonato Brasileiro Série A players
La Liga players
Serie A players
UEFA Cup winning players
Brazil international footballers
1986 FIFA World Cup players
1989 Copa América players
1990 FIFA World Cup players
Copa América-winning players
Brazilian expatriate footballers
Brazilian expatriate sportspeople in Spain
Brazilian expatriate sportspeople in Italy
Expatriate footballers in Spain
Expatriate footballers in Italy
Brazilian football managers
América Futebol Clube (MG) managers
Nacional Futebol Clube managers
Central Sport Club managers
Atlético Rio Negro Clube managers
Sportspeople from Minas Gerais